Jangipur or Zangipur is a town and a nagar panchayat in Ghazipur district in the Indian state of Uttar Pradesh.

Demographics
 India census, Jangipur had a population of 11,100. Males constitute 52% of the population and females 48%. Jangipur has an average literacy rate of 58%, lower than the national average of 59.5%: male literacy is 67%, and female literacy is 47%. In Jangipur, 19% of the population is under 6 years of age.

References

Cities and towns in Ghazipur district